Robert Lorimer "Bobby" McCubbin (16 June 1868 – 10 March 1950) was  a former Australian rules footballer who played with Collingwood in the Victorian Football League (VFL).

Notes

External links 
		
Bobby McCubbin's profile at Collingwood Forever

1868 births
1950 deaths
Australian rules footballers from Victoria (Australia)
Collingwood Football Club players
Williamstown Football Club players